Corsica Libera is a left-wing separatist political party active in Corsica. It was founded in Corte in February 2009 by members of three nationalist parties, Corsica Nazione, Rinnovu and the Corsican Nationalist Alliance.

Corsica Libera advocates full independence for Corsica and it does not condemn the violent actions by groups such as the National Liberation Front of Corsica. The party distinguished itself with its symbolic occupation of Christian Clavier's Corsican residence. 
The party has one seat in the Corsican Assembly and a number of local councillors, including the mayor of the small village Granace.

The party's candidate in the 2010 territorial elections, Jean-Guy Talamoni, won 9.36% of the vote and qualified for the runoff. In the first round of the 2015 French regional elections, Corsica Libera received 7.73% of the vote.

References

Political parties of the French Fifth Republic
Political parties in Corsica
Separatism in France
Pro-independence parties
Political parties established in 2009
Left-wing nationalist parties
Socialist parties in France